The Late Edition is a British television programme broadcast on BBC Four. It takes the form of a weekly topical chat show in the vein of The Daily Show, presented by comedian Marcus Brigstocke. Each episode typically features comical news commentary from Brigstocke, satirical interviews with fictional political figures played by Steve Furst, 'Andre Vincent investigates' and two "real" interviews.

In 2007, 2008 and 2009, Brigstocke performed a special version of the show at the Edinburgh Fringe called The Early Edition with Andre Vincent.

References

External links
 

 

British satirical television series
News parodies
BBC Television shows
2005 British television series debuts
2000s British satirical television series
2008 British television series endings